Castêlo da Maia Ginásio Clube is a volleyball team based in Maia, Portugal. Castêlo was created on 5 February 1973. It plays in the Portuguese Volleyball League A1.

Achievements

Men 
 Portuguese Volleyball League A1: 4
2000–01, 2001–02, 2002–03, 2003–04

 Portuguese Volleyball Cup: 6
1993–94, 2001–02, 2002–03, 2003–04, 2009–10, 2013–14

 Portuguese Volleyball SuperCup: 5
1994, 1996, 1999, 2001, 2010

Portuguese Volleyball League II: 1
1989–90

Portuguese Volleyball League III: 2

Women 
Portuguese Volleyball League A1: 6
1997-1998, 1998-1999, 1999-2000, 2000-2001, 2001-2002, 2002–2003

Portuguese Volleyball Cup: 8
1995-1996, 1996-1997, 1997-1998, 1998-1999, 1999-2000, 2001–2002, 2002-2003, 2003-2004
Portuguese SuperCup: 6
Portuguese Volleyball League III: 1

External links
Zerozero

Portuguese volleyball teams
Maia, Portugal